Walid Ahmad Saleh is a scholar of Quranic studies and professor of Islamic studies at the University of Toronto.

Biography
Walid Saleh attended the American University of Beirut, and graduated with a BA in Arabic language and literature in 1989. He received a PhD in Islamic studies from Yale University in 2001. He received a DAAD grant in 1996–1997, and pursued his studies in Hamburg under the tutelage of the late Albrecht Noth. Saleh has received numerous honors and fellowships. He was awarded a New Directions Fellowship by the Mellon Foundation in 2014, and the Humboldt Foundation in Germany has made him a Konrad Adenauer Fellow (2017). Additionally, he has received funding from the SSHRC and the Library of Congress' Kluge Foundation.

Works
 In Defense of the Bible: A Critical Edition and an Introduction to Al-Biqa`i's Bible Treatise
 The Formation of the Classical Tafsir Tradition

See also
 Behnam Sadeghi

References

Islamic studies scholars
Academic staff of the University of Toronto
American University of Beirut alumni
Yale University alumni
Living people
21st-century Muslim theologians
Year of birth missing (living people)
Muslim scholars of Islamic studies